Shield AI is an American aerospace and defense technology company based in San Diego, California. It develops artificial intelligence-powered fighter pilots, drones, and technology for defense operations. Its clients include the US Air Force, US Army and Brazil Armed Forces. 

Shield AI's valuation is currently $2.3 billion.

The company’s small-unmanned aircraft system (sUAS) Nova became the first AI-powered drone to be deployed for defense purposes in US military history.

History
Shield AI was founded as a defense and artificial intelligence technology startup by former-Navy Seal Officer Brandon Tseng, his brother Ryan Tseng, and Andrew Reiter in San Diego, California in 2015. According to David Ignatius, writing for The Washington Post, ex-Navy SEAL Brandon got the startup idea while fighting in Afghanistan. In one of the missions, his unit suffered casualties in the Uruzgan province due to poor reconnaissance of a hostile building. The founding team began operations with a seed fund of $100,000 gathered from friends and family. They began building a prototype of their flagship Nova drone in 2015.

In 2016, Shield AI received its first contract, one from the US Department of Defense’s Defense Innovation Unit (DIU) autonomy program. As part of this contract, Nova was first deployed for reconnaissance and combat assistance in the Middle East in 2018.

In 2021, the company received a $7.2 million contract from the US Air Force for its small-unmanned aircraft systems (sUAS). It later acquired defense contractor Heron Systems and aerospace company Martin UAV for undisclosed amounts. The same year in November, based on company press releases The Dallas Morning News reported that the company was valued at over $1 billion following a funding round. Over the years, it has received funding from venture capitalist firms such as Andreessen Horowitz, Breyer Capital, and Silicon Valley Bank. 

In June 2022, TechCrunch announced the company’s press release valuation at $2.3 billion.

In 2022, the company received another contract from the US Air Force, through the Pentagon’s AfVentures Strategic Funding Increase (AFWERX-STRATFI) Program. FedScoop reported the contract to be worth $60 million. In July 2022, it was chosen as one of several companies to aid the US Air Force for its Joint All Domain Command and Control (JADC2) program.

In 2022,  the company opened an office in the United Arab Emirates under retired Navy SEAL vice-admiral Bob Harward. The United States Sixth Fleet included the subject in its "Digital Horizon" sea exercise in Bahrain in November 2022 to demonstrate unmanned and artificial intelligence capabilities.

Technology
Shield AI employs machine learning and artificial intelligence to develop defense software and tools. It developed Nova, an autonomous quadcopter drone, and Hivemind, its autonomy and artificial intelligence stack in 2015. This  software helps drones and aircraft maneuver autonomously in GPS- and communication-degraded environments. Its products are used for reconnaissance in close-quarters combat and solving problems like room-clearing and fatal funnel.

Nova is an autonomous quadcopter drone categorized as a sUAS that runs using lidar technology and can navigate in GPS-agnostic environments. When used in military combat missions, the drone can enter a hostile building and send its photos and maps to a unit of soldiers to help them better navigate it. Nova and Hivemind have since been used by the US Special Operations Command for reconnaissance and combat operations. According to WIRED’s Elliot Ackerman, this was likely the first time an AI-powered drone was being used for defense purposes in US military history. The Wall Street Journal called it “the first autonomous robot of its kind used in combat”. In 2021, the company released Nova 2.

Shield AI also develops AI-powered vertical take-off and landing (VTOL) aircraft called V-BAT through its acquisition of Martin UAV. In 2022, Brazil ordered a batch of V-BATs for its defense unit.

Recognition
In 2020, Fast Company ranked Shield AI 5th on its list of the World’s Most Innovative Companies under the Robotics category. The same year, co-founders Brandon and Ryan Tseng were featured on WIRED25, the magazine’s annual list of “people who made things better”.

In 2021, Forbes added it to its list of America’s Most Promising Artificial Intelligence Companies. The company was ranked 287th in the Inc. 5000 2021. The Wall Street Journal featured the company’s Nova drone in its “100 Years of Robots” list.

In 2022, Forbes ranked Shield AI 97th in its list of America’s Best Startup Employers.

References 

Unmanned military aircraft
Systems engineering
Engineering disciplines
Artificial intelligence
Unsolved problems in computer science